In optics, spatial cutoff frequency is a precise way to quantify the smallest object resolvable by an optical system.  Due to diffraction at the image plane, all optical systems act as low pass filters with a finite ability to resolve detail.  If it were not for the effects of diffraction, a 2" aperture telescope could theoretically be used to read newspapers on a planet circling Alpha Centauri, over four light-years distant.  Unfortunately, the wave nature of light will never permit this to happen.

The spatial cutoff frequency for a perfectly corrected incoherent optical system is given by

 
As an example, a telescope having an  objective and imaging at 0.55 micrometers has a spatial cutoff frequency of 303 cycles/millimeter. High-resolution black-and-white film is capable of resolving details on the film as small as 3 micrometers or smaller, thus its cutoff frequency is about 150 cycles/millimeter. So, the telescope's optical resolution is about twice that of high-resolution film, and a crisp, sharp picture would result (provided focus is perfect and atmospheric turbulence is at a minimum).

This formula gives the best-case resolution performance and is valid only for perfect optical systems.  The presence of aberrations reduces image contrast and can effectively reduce the system spatial cutoff frequency if the image contrast falls below the ability of the imaging device to discern.

The coherent case is given by

See also 
 Modulation transfer function
 Superlens

References

Goodman, J.A., Introduction to Fourier Optics, McGraw Hill, 1969.

Optics